The Moreton Bay fig tree in San Diego's Balboa Park is one of the largest trees in California.

History
It began its life when it was planted in 1914. During the Panama–California Exposition it was part of the San Diego County garden exhibit; as of 2017 it is the last remaining plant from the exhibit. The area underneath it was fenced off to the public in 1989 due to damage to the fig caused by foot traffic.

References

External links

 

Balboa Park (San Diego)
Individual fig trees
Individual trees in California